H. Andrew Schwartz is an American journalist and chief communications officer at the Center for Strategic and International Studies (CSIS).

Education 
In 1986 Schwartz enrolled at Tulane University where he earned a B.A. in political science in 1990. In 1995 he obtained an M.A. in broadcast journalism and public policy from American University.

Career 
Schwartz started his career as research assistant to Stuart E. Eizenstat, the former Carter domestic policy adviser, at Powell, Goldstein, Frazer, and Murphy LLP.

He also was a legislative fellow in the offices of Senator J. Bennett Johnston (D-La.) and Representative Lindy Boggs (D-La.).

Schwartz later worked for Fox News. He was a producer for the channel's Special Report with Brit Hume and afterwards became one of the network's White House producers. He has written for The Washington Post, The Washington Times, and other national newspapers and magazines.

In August 2005, Schwartz became deputy director for external relations at CSIS where he is currently chief communications officer.

At CSIS he serves as spokesman and is responsible for media relations, digital strategy and production, publications, events and external matters. In addition, he oversees the iDeasLab, a collaborative think tank space and multimedia production facility.

Schwartz writes "The Evening” daily brief for CSIS and co-hosts the podcast "About the News" together with CSIS trustee Bob Schieffer.

Affiliations 
 Board of Visitors, Texas Christian University (TCU) College of Communication
 Editorial Board, The Washington Quarterly
 Dean's Advisory Council, Tulane University's School of Liberal Arts
 Member Emeritus, board of directors of the National Press Foundation

Publication 
 Overload: Finding the Truth in Today's Deluge of News (2017) with Bob Schieffer

References

External links

Living people
American male journalists
Fox News people
20th-century American non-fiction writers
Tulane University alumni
American University alumni
Year of birth missing (living people)
20th-century American male writers